Peter Lee may refer to:
Peter Lee (bishop of Christ the King) (born 1947), England-born Anglican bishop, working in South Africa
Peter Lee (bishop of Virginia) (born 1938), American bishop of the Episcopal Church
Peter Lee (chess player) (born 1943), English chess player
Peter Lee (computer scientist) (born 1960), American computer scientist
Peter Lee (cricketer) (born 1945), English cricketer
Peter Lee (ice hockey) (born 1956), ice hockey manager and retired player
Peter Lee (trade unionist) (1864–1935), mine union leader in County Durham, England
Peter Lee (engineer) (born 1954), Australian engineer and academic
Peter Lee Ka-kit (born 1963), vice-chairman and managing director of Henderson Land Development
Peter Lee Jung-sum (1939–2008), Hong Kong meteorologist, elder brother of Bruce Lee
Peter Lee,  arrested for allegedly giving submarine radar secrets to China; see Timeline of the Cox Report controversy
Pete Lee (born 1947), Colorado state legislator
Peter P. Lee (1861–1937), American politician
Peter Lee (director), Chinese film director
Peter Lee (Gaelic footballer) (born 1955), Irish Gaelic footballer

See also
Peterlee, County Durham, England
Peter Li (disambiguation)
Peter Leigh (born 1939), footballer
Empire River, a ship later renamed Peter Leigh